The Rage is a 1997 Canadian-American action-thriller film directed by Sidney J. Furie.

Plot
FBI Special Agent Travis is trying to catch a deranged serial killer and is doing his best despite having Kelly McCord as a new and inexperienced partner. It turns out that the serial killer is an entire army of disgruntled CIA mercenaries from Vietnam.

Production
The film was produced by Toronto company Norstar, with Miramax's Dimension label later acquiring distribution rights.

It featured Gary Busey's then-wife Tiani Warden, playing the psychopathic girlfriend of Busey's character. Warden, who was 23 years Busey's junior, appeared in several of his projects during 1996–1997. She later divorced Busey, and died of a cocaine overdose while in jail during 2019. David Carradine also plays a small role in the film.

Release and reception
The Rage debuted on home video in the UK during June 1997, and would be released in Australia and several other European countries that year. In the USA, it premiered on VHS on June 16, 1998. It was subsequently released onto DVD by Dimension Home Video in 2004.

The film was noted for its over-the-top style and violence. TV Guide gave it a negative review, commenting that "logic is not this film's imperative." They write, "contributing to the movie's moronic approach is the central figure of Gary Busey, a star so over-the-top he can never be taken seriously. Even if the film had better acting, The Rage would still suffer from such plot incredulities as survivalists practicing on tourists for a political assassination and a career FBI chief attempting to murder an agent who was willing to give him credit for a major case solution."

References

External links

1997 films
Films directed by Sidney J. Furie
Films scored by Paul Zaza
1997 action thriller films
American action thriller films
1990s English-language films
1990s American films